Passiflora andina is a species of plant in the family Passifloraceae. It is endemic to Ecuador.

References

andina
Endemic flora of Ecuador
Endangered plants
Taxonomy articles created by Polbot